Andrei Vladimirovich Pchelyakov (born February 19, 1972) is a Kazakhstani former professional ice hockey forward.

He was a member of the Kazakhstan men's national ice hockey team at the 2006 Winter Olympics as well as the IIHF 2006 World Ice Hockey Championships. He also competed at the 1998 Winter Olympics and the 2006 Winter Olympics.

Career statistics

Regular season and playoffs

International

References

1972 births
Living people
Amur Khabarovsk players
HC Astana players
Avangard Omsk players
HK Gomel players
Kazakhstani ice hockey right wingers
Soviet ice hockey right wingers
Kazzinc-Torpedo players
Krylya Sovetov Moscow players
Metallurg Novokuznetsk players
Metallurg Zhlobin players
HC MVD players
Severstal Cherepovets players
SKA Saint Petersburg players
Shinnik Bobruisk players
Olympic ice hockey players of Kazakhstan
Ice hockey players at the 1998 Winter Olympics
Ice hockey players at the 2006 Winter Olympics
Asian Games gold medalists for Kazakhstan
Medalists at the 1996 Asian Winter Games
Asian Games medalists in ice hockey
Ice hockey players at the 1996 Asian Winter Games
Sportspeople from Oskemen